Werner Stutz (born 31 March 1883) was a Swiss footballer who played as forward or midfielder.

Football career

Stutz joined FC Basel's first team during their 1899–1900 season. In this season the club did not compete in the Swiss Serie A, they played only friendly games. Stutz played only one friendly game on 15 April 1900 as Basel were defeated 4–5 by Zürich. The following season he played with Basel's reserve team who at that time played in the Serie B, the second tier of Swiss football. In their 1901–02 season, after playing in another test game, Stutz played his domestic league debut for the club in the away game on 20 October 1901 as Basel were defeated 0–2 by local rivals Old Boys.

He stayed with the team until 1904 and during his time with them, Stutz played a total of 14 games for Basel without scoring a goal. Seven of these games were in the Swiss Serie A and seven were friendly games. He probably played in more games than mentioned, but the documentation is incomplete.

Notes

Footnotes

Incomplete league matches 1901–1902 season: FCB-OB, Excelsior-FCB, FCB-Fortuna

Incomplete league matches 1903–1904 season: Bern-FCB, FCB-OB

References

Sources
 Rotblau: Jahrbuch Saison 2017/2018. Publisher: FC Basel Marketing AG. 
 Die ersten 125 Jahre. Publisher: Josef Zindel im Friedrich Reinhardt Verlag, Basel. 
 Verein "Basler Fussballarchiv" Homepage
(NB: Despite all efforts, the editors of these books and the authors in "Basler Fussballarchiv" have failed to be able to identify all the players, their date and place of birth or date and place of death, who played in the games during the early years of FC Basel.)

FC Basel players
Swiss men's footballers
Association football midfielders
Association football forwards
Swiss Super League players
1883 births
Date of death missing